Saadi Youssef (1934 – 13 June 2021) was an Iraqi author, poet, journalist, publisher, and political activist. He published thirty volumes of poetry in addition to seven books of prose.

Life
Saadi Youssef studied Arabic literature in Baghdad. He was influenced by the free verse of Shathel Taqa and Abd al-Wahhab Al-Bayyati and was also involved in politics from an early age. At that time, his work was heavily influenced by his socialist and pan-Arab sympathies but has since also taken a more introspective, lyrical turn. He has also translated many well-known writers into Arabic, including Oktay Rifat, Melih Cevdet Anday, Garcia Lorca, Yiannis Ritsos, Walt Whitman and Constantine Cavafy. Following his exile from Iraq, Youssef has lived in many countries, including Algeria, Lebanon, France, Greece, Cyprus, and resided in London until his death.

In 2004, the Al Owais Prize for poetry was given to Youssef. In 2007, Youssef participated in the PEN World Voices festival where he was interviewed by the Wild River Review. In 2014, Youssef's poems were forbidden from being included in the Kurdish school curriculum by the Kurdistan Regional Government over a certain poem in which he referred to Kurdistan as "Qardistan," which loosely translates to "Monkey-istan."

He is buried on the eastern side of Highgate Cemetery.

English bibliography 
Published volumes
Without an Alphabet, Without a Face: Selected Poems, translated by Khaled Mattawa (Graywolf, 2002). .
Nostalgia, My Enemy, translated by Sinan Antoon and Peter Money (Graywolf, 2012). .

In anthology
Literature from the "Axis of Evil": Writing from Iran, Iraq, North Korea and Other Enemy Nations, edited by Words without Borders (The New Press, 2006). .
Tablet and Pen, edited by Reza Aslan (Norton, 2010). .
Ghost Fishing: An Eco-Justice Poetry Anthology, edited by Melissa Tuckey (University of Georgia Press, 2018). .

Further reading
 Huri, Yair. The Poetry of Sa’di Yûsuf: Between Homeland and Exile. (Sussex, 2006). .

See also
 Iraqi art
 List of Iraqi artists

References

External links 
Listen to Saadi Youssef reading his poetry - a British Library recording, 4 March 2009.
 
 Two poems
 Spiral of Iraqi memory review of Without an Alphabet at Al-Ahram
 Iraqi poet Saadi Youssef on 'bullet censorship' at Socialist Worker

1934 births
2021 deaths
Burials at Highgate Cemetery
20th-century Iraqi writers
20th-century Iraqi poets
People from Basra
British people of Iraqi descent
21st-century Iraqi poets
21st-century Iraqi writers
British Arabic-language poets